DQE could refer to:

DQE Holdings, Inc.
De Queen and Eastern Railroad; reporting mark DQE
Detective Quantum Efficiency (imaging)
DQE (band)